An Inspector General of Police is a senior police officer in the police force or police service of several nations. The rank usually refers to the head of a large regional command within a police service, and in many countries refers to the most senior officer of the entire national police.

Bangladesh
In Bangladesh, the Bangladesh Inspector General of Police heads the Bangladesh Police.

Ghana
In Ghana, Inspector General of Police is the title of the head of the Ghana Police Service.

India    
During the British India era, the British Government introduced the Indian Councils Act 1861. The act created a new cadre of police, called Superior Police Services, later known as the Indian Imperial Police. The highest rank in the service was the Inspector General.

Currently, in modern India, an Inspector General of Police (IGP) is only an officer from Indian Police Service. In a state, an IGP holds the third-highest rank in the hierarchy, just below the rank of Additional Director General of Police and above Deputy Inspector General of Police. IG-ranked wear Gorget patches on their collar. Although it has a dark blue background which is similar to DIGs and SSPs, an oak leaf pattern is stitched on the patch; unlike DIGs and SSPs, which have a white line stitched on the patch.

Indonesia
In Indonesia, an Inspector General of Police (Inspektur Jenderal Polisi or abbreviated Irjen (Pol)) holds the third highest rank of the Indonesian National Police (equivalent to a major general in the Indonesian National Armed Forces). Usually, police with rank Inspector General of Police became a chief of regional police department with "Type-A Classification" (capital city, strategic and major/densely populated provinces), chief of divisions, special staff to the Chief of National Police, or deputy head of any agency under the police's territory.

Kenya
In Kenya, the Inspector-General of Police is the senior most police officer, who has the overall command of the Kenya National Police Service. In the event of a vacancy arising, the procedure for appointment of the Inspector-General is: 
 within 14 days the National Police Service Commission (hereafter "the Commission"), by notice in the Gazette and at least two other daily newspapers of national circulation, declares the vacancy, and requests for applications;
 the Commission conducts public interviews and shortlists at least three persons qualified for the position which are then published in the Gazette;
 within seven days from shortlisting, the Commission forwards the shortlisted names to the President for nomination;
 within seven days of receipt of the names, the President nominates a person for appointment and submits the name of the nominee to Parliament for approval;
 within fourteen days thereafter, Parliament vets and considers the nominee, and either approves or rejects the nomination;
 Parliament notifies the President as to its approval or rejection;
 if Parliament approves the nominee, within seven days of receiving the notification the President, by notice in the Gazette, appoints the nominee as the Inspector-General of the National Police Service .
 where Parliament rejects the nominee submitted by the President, the Speaker of the National Assembly communicates its decision to the President and requests a fresh nominee.
 in submitting a new nominee, within seven days the President submits to Parliament a fresh nomination from amongst the persons shortlisted and forwarded by the Commission.
The IG is charged with the overall administrative management of the police force, exercises independent command over the National Police Service and performs any other functions prescribed by national legislation. Consequently, the Inspector-General reports directly to the President and is also a member of the National Security Council, chaired by the President.  Under the IG are two Deputy Inspectors-General who command the Kenya Police Service and the Administration Police Service respectively. The Inspector-General is appointed for a single four-year term, and is not eligible for re-appointment. The Inspector-General may be removed from office by the President only on the grounds of: 
 serious violation of the Constitution of Kenya or any other law, including a contravention of Chapter Six of the Constitution;
 gross misconduct whether in the performance of the office holder’s functions or otherwise;
 physical or mental incapacity to perform the functions of office;
 incompetence;
 bankruptcy; or
 any other just cause.

Malawi
In Malawi, the Inspector General of Police is the head of the Malawi Police Force. It is an appointed position in the gift of the President of Malawi.

Malaysia
In Malaysia, the Inspector-General of Police heads the Royal Malaysia Police.

Nepal
In Nepal, the Inspector General of Police is the highest rank of the Nepal Police and Armed Police Force. Shailesh Thapa Chhetri is current IGP of Nepal police.

Nigeria
An Inspector-General of Police heads the Nigeria Police Force.

Pakistan
In Pakistan, the inspector general of police heads the police force of a province. The IGP is appointed at Grade BS 22/21. The inspector general of police (IGP) is a Police Service of Pakistan officer, appointed by the federal government with consent of provincial chief minister. The rank insignia is the national emblem or one pip above a crossed sword and baton worn on shoulder flashes.

Sierra Leone
In Sierra Leone the Inspector General of Police is the head of the Sierra Leone Police force. He heads the force (nationally), which is one of the oldest continuously operational police services in Africa. He is assisted by a Deputy Inspector General, and several Assistant Inspectors General.

Sri Lanka
In Sri Lanka, the Inspector General of Police heads the Sri Lanka Police Service.

Uganda
The Inspector General of Police is the highest rank in the Uganda Police Force (UPF). Since 2001, the position has been held by a two-star military general of the Uganda People's Defense Force (UPDF).

United Kingdom
In Northern Ireland, the chief officer of the former Royal Ulster Constabulary (now replaced by the Police Service of Northern Ireland) was titled inspector general until 1970, when following a review the post was renamed chief constable.

References

India
Police ranks of India
Inspector General
Two-star officers
Police ranks of Sri Lanka